Hell Bent for Leather is a vinyl-only compilation album by Milan the Leather Boy that also features a second side of songs that he wrote and/or produced for others throughout the 1960s.

Release data
This album was released in 2009 as an LP only (#LS-001LP) and is evidently the initial release by a French label LS. A logo in the lower left-hand corner of the front cover says "Licorice Schtik" (one of the bands featured on Side 2); "LS" is evidently an abbreviation for this band name.

Track listing

Side one

 The Leather Boy: "On the Go"
 Milan (The Leather Boy): "You Gotta Have Soul"
 The World of Milan: "Luva-Luva"
 Milan: "Runnin' Wild"
 The World of Milan: "Follow the Sun"
 The Leather Boy: "Soulin'"
 The Leather Boy: "I'm a Leather Boy"
 The Leather Boy: "Shadows"

Side two
 The Head Shop: "Head Shop"
 The Chanters: "Bongo Bongo"
 Lou Christie: "How Many Teardrops"
 Licorice Schtik: "Kissin' Game"
 The Unclaimed: "Memories of Green Eyes"
 Licorice Schtik: "Flowers Flowers"
 The Head Shop: "Infinity"

2009 compilation albums
Garage rock albums by American artists
Milan the Leather Boy albums